Beadle is an unincorporated community in the Rural Municipality of Kindersley No. 290, Saskatchewan, Canada.

See also

 List of communities in Saskatchewan

References

External links

Kindersley No. 290, Saskatchewan
Unincorporated communities in Saskatchewan
Division No. 13, Saskatchewan